Sviatohirsk is a city in the northern part of the Donetsk Region of Ukraine. A part of the Sloviansk Municipality, it stands on the banks of the Siverskyi Donets River,  from the city of Sloviansk. The population is  The 16th-century Sviatohirsk Lavra Monastery is located in the city.

History 

A settlement in the area of the Holy Mountains was first mentioned in written sources in the 16th century. In 1624, the Sviatohirsk Lavra Holy Mountains monastery was established here, but in the end of the 18th century all monastic lands were secularized and passed on to private owners. One of the new owners built a bathing house on the nearby lake, which led to the settlement being called Banne/Bannoye or Bannovskoye; literally bathing. The proximity of a nearby selo of Tatyanovka lead to both places sometimes being collectively referred as Bannoye-Tatyanovka.

During the Soviet times, the selo was officially known as Bannoye. In 1938, it was granted urban-type settlement status and renamed Bannovsky. The settlement served as a resort destination and steadily grew in size, until in 1964 it was granted town status and renamed Slovianohirsk/Slavyanogorsk, with the first part of the name (Sloviano-/Slavyano-) being after the nearby city of Sloviansk (Slavyansk), and the second part (-hirsk/-gorsk) being after the Holy Mountains. In 2003, the name was changed to Sviatohirsk, after the monastery itself.

Russian Invasion of Ukraine 

Unlike neighboring Sloviansk, Sviatohirsk was never controlled by the pro-Russian forces who in spring 2014 had made Sloviansk their stronghold. In contrast to most of the Donbas region, which is largely flat open landscape, Sviatohirsk is set among hills and forests - providing some natural defences - making it harder for an army to manoeuvre with artillery and tanks. The city is seen as strategically important during the conflict, due to it being one of the key points preventing an encirclement of the Ukrainian army in Donetsk oblast.

Following the start of the 2022 Russo-Ukrainian war, the press service of the Ukrainian Orthodox Church (Moscow Patriarchate) reported the deaths of two monks and a nun of the city's monastery as a result of shelling on 1 June, 2022. On June 4, as a result of further hostilities in the region, one of the temples of the monastery was engulfed in flames. Ukrainian president Volodymyr Zelenskyy blamed Russian forces for the resulting burning of the temple and mourned the victims, while calling for Russia's expulsion from UNESCO over it. However, the mayor of the city, Volodymyr Bandura, blamed Ukrainian forces for the burning of the temple while in Russian captivity, accusing Zelenskyy of lying. The Security Service of Ukraine later accused the mayor of treason over this statement.

According to the Institute for the Study of War, there were reports of the city partially coming under Russian control after a battle on May 31. On June 6, Igor Konashenkov, Russian Defense Ministry spokesperson, stated that Russian forces were completing the capture of the city. Later that day, Denis Pushilin, head of the Donetsk People's Republic, stated that Sviatohirsk was almost cleared of Ukrainian forces, except for an unnamed height somewhere in the city. Russian minister of defense Sergei Shoigu announced the city's complete capture the next day, on June 7.

Following the Ukrainian eastern counteroffensive of 2022, on 10 September reports appeared in Ukrainian media that the Ukrainian armed forces had retaken the city from Russian control. On 12 September 2022, the Ukrainian armed forces confirmed that they were in control of the city.

Culture 
Sviatohirsk includes the Holy Dormition Sviatohirsk Lavra, the Holy Mountains National Park, an historical and architectural reserve, as well as a resort of national importance; thirty objects, among them a monumental sculpture of Communist leader Artem (Fyodor Sergeyev) and a World War II memorial (opened on the day of 40th anniversary of victory) are included in the historic monuments complex of the reserve. The town has been visited by well-known cultural figures, including Hryhorii Skovoroda, Fyodor Tyutchev, Ivan Bunin, Anton Chekhov, Maxim Gorky, Marina Tsvetaeva, and Ilya Repin.

On May 15, 2015, President of Ukraine Petro Poroshenko signed a bill into law that started a six months period for the removal of communist monuments and the mandatory renaming of settlements with a name related to Communism. However, since the Artem monument is listed as "National Cultural Heritage" it will not be demolished.

Demographics 
According to the State Statistics Service of Ukraine, the population of the city was  The results of the 2001 Ukrainian census found that the city's population was 3,805, of which 65.49% considered Ukrainian as their mother tongue, 33.96% Russian, 0.24% Armenian, 0.13% Belarusian, and 0.08% Moldovan.

Tourism 
The development plan of Sviatohirsk provides a significant expansion of the resorts, recreational, and tourism network. Within the Sviatohirsk resort are the Holy Mountain sanatorium and hotel-and-tourist complexes. The town carries out a construction and modernization of recreation departments for children and adults.

Early in 2009, a four-star hotel opened. Sviatohirsk also offers the Siverskyi Donets River, chalk mountains, coniferous and mixed forests, centuries-old oak trees, and clean air.

Gallery

References

Sources 
 [1] Е. М. Поспелов (Ye.M. Pospelov). "Имена городов: вчера и сегодня (1917–1992). Топонимический словарь." (City Names: Yesterday and Today (1917–1992). Toponymic Dictionary.) Москва, "Русские словари", 1993.
 [2] Е. М. Поспелов (Ye.M. Pospelov). "Географические названия мира" (Geographic Names of the World). Москва, 1998.

External links 

 Official web site of Sviatohirsk 

Cities in Donetsk Oblast
Cities of district significance in Ukraine
Kramatorsk Raion